Leandro Amaro dos Santos Ferreira (born June 19, 1986, in Campinas) is a Brazilian football defender, who plays for São Bernardo.

Career
Contracted since his youth with Cruzeiro Esporte Clube, Leandro Amaro had several loan spells with  Cabofriense, Villa Nova, Marilia, Villa Nova, Goianiense and Botafogo-SP before signing for Palmeiras in 2010. After two years in the Palmeiras team he was loaned out successively to Avaí, Náutico and Chapecoense in 2013 and 2014 before his contract expired.

In 2015 he was contracted to ABC, but agreed a mutual termination in August. He played with Itumbiara in early 2016, but was signed by Mirassol in April of that year to strengthen their side in the quarter-final stages of the Campeonato Paulista second division. At the end of that campaign he moved to Guarani for the 2016 Campeonato Brasileiro Série C, winning promotion. He was not retained by Guarani, and signed for Ferroviária for the 2017 Campeonato Paulista. From there he agreed a contract with Oeste for the 2017 Campeonato Brasileiro Série B. The club finished 6th, and he renewed for the 2018 season, but after a poor start to the Série B campaign he was released and immediately re-signed for Mirassol for their 2018 Copa Paulista and 2019 Campeonato Paulista campaigns.

He signed for Botafogo-SP, newly promoted to Série B, in April 2019.

Career statistics

Honours
Palmeiras
Copa do Brasil: 2012

References

External links
CBF 

1986 births
Living people
Brazilian footballers
Association football defenders
Cruzeiro Esporte Clube players
Associação Desportiva Cabofriense players
Villa Nova Atlético Clube players
Atlético Clube Goianiense players
Marília Atlético Clube players
Sociedade Esportiva Palmeiras players
Avaí FC players
Clube Náutico Capibaribe players
Associação Chapecoense de Futebol players
ABC Futebol Clube players
Botafogo Futebol Clube (SP) players
Itumbiara Esporte Clube players
Mirassol Futebol Clube players
Guarani FC players
Associação Ferroviária de Esportes players
Oeste Futebol Clube players
São Bernardo Futebol Clube players
Campeonato Brasileiro Série A players
Campeonato Brasileiro Série B players
Campeonato Brasileiro Série C players
Sportspeople from Campinas